The 2019 Nigerian House of Representatives elections in Zamfara State was held on February 23, 2019, to elect members of the House of Representatives to represent Zamfara State, Nigeria. The All Progressives Congress won all seats but the Supreme Court nullified the elections of all the candidates of the APC in the elections. The court ruled that the APC did not conduct valid primaries in the build-up to the elections. A unanimous judgement by a five-member panel of Judges decided that the party had no valid candidate and cannot be said to have won the general elections.

Overview

Summary

Results

Anka/Talata/Mafara 
A total of 16 candidates registered with the Independent National Electoral Commission to contest in the election. PDP candidate Kabiru Yahaya won the election. APC candidate Ahmad Anka won the popular votes but his election was nullified on the ground that his party did not conduct a valid primary. Yahaya received 69.76% of the votes.

Bakura/Maradun 
A total of 16 candidates registered with the Independent National Electoral Commission to contest in the election. PDP candidate Ahmed Bakura Muhammad won the election. APC candidate Muhammed Rini won the popular votes but his election was nullified on the ground that his party did not conduct a valid primary. Muhammad received 84.49% of the votes.

Bungudu/Maru 
A total of 13 candidates registered with the Independent National Electoral Commission to contest in the election. PDP candidate Shehu Ahmed won the election. APC candidate Zubairu Abdulmalik won the popular votes but his election was nullified on the ground that his party did not conduct a valid primary. Ahmed received 45.22% of the votes.

Gunmi/Bukkuyum 
A total of 14 candidates registered with the Independent National Electoral Commission to contest in the election. PDP candidate Sulaiman Gumi Abubakar won the election.  APC candidate Bukkuyum Unaru Jibo won the popular votes but his election was nullified on the ground that his party did not conduct a valid primary. Abubakar received 76.00% of the votes.

Gusau/Tsafe 
A total of 25 candidates registered with the Independent National Electoral Commission to contest in the election. PDP candidate Kabiru Amadu won the election. APC candidate Rikiji Garba won the popular votes but his election was nullified on the ground that his party did not conduct a valid primary. Amadu received 54.91% of the votes.

Kaura Namoda/Birnin Magaji 
A total of 20 candidates registered with the Independent National Electoral Commission to contest in the election. PDP candidate Sani Umar Dan-Galadima won the election. APC candidate Muhammed Birnin-magaji won the popular votes but his election was nullified on the ground that his party did not conduct a valid primary. Dan-Galadima received 92.88% of the votes.

Shinkafi/Zurmi 
A total of 15 candidates registered with the Independent National Electoral Commission to contest in the election. PDP candidate Bello Shinkafi won the election. APC candidate Husaini Zurmi won the popular votes but his election was nullified on the ground that his party did not conduct a valid primary. Shinkafi received 66.45% of the votes.

References 

Zamfara State House of Representatives elections
House of Representatives
Zamfara